Serishabad District is a district (bakhsh) in Qorveh County, Kurdistan Province, Iran. At the 2006 census, its population was 20,263, in 5,001 families.  The District has one city: Serishabad. The District has three rural districts (dehestan): Lak Rural District, Qaslan Rural District, and Yalghuz Aghaj Rural District.

References 

Qorveh County
Districts of Kurdistan Province